The following is an alphabetical list of members of the United States House of Representatives from Alaska's at-large congressional district, and thus the state of Alaska. For chronological tables of members of both houses of the United States Congress from the state (through the present day), see United States congressional delegations from Alaska.  The list of names should be complete (as of January 3, 2015), but other data may be incomplete. It includes members who have represented both the state and the territory, both past and present.

Current member

There is only one district, therefore only one member:

 Mary Peltola (D), serving since August 16, 2022

List of members and delegates

See also

 List of United States senators from Alaska
 United States congressional delegations from Alaska
 Alaska's congressional districts

Notes

References

 
United States Representatives 
Alaska